S.O.S. Perils of the Sea is a 1925 American silent action drama film featuring Elaine Hammerstein, directed by James P. Hogan, and released through Columbia Pictures.

Plot
As described in a film magazine review, Rose is a girl who is saved from a torpedoed liner and adopted by two young fishermen, brothers Ralph and Jim, both of whom fall in love with her when she grows older. The young woman is an heiress but does not know it. One of the brothers is aware that a large sum has been willed to the woman and he resolves that she shall be his wife. Later, the three members of the love triangle are trapped on a burning steamer. The brother who wishes to obtain the money is drowned, but the other brother and Rose escape and are wed.

Cast

Production
The film is shot in black-and-white film, but includes a hand-colored shipwreck sequence.

Preservation
A print of S.O.S. Perils of the Sea is in the Library of Congress collection.

References

External links

1925 films
American silent feature films
American black-and-white films
Films directed by James Patrick Hogan
1925 drama films
American drama films
Columbia Pictures films
1920s American films
Silent American drama films